Odontotermes koenigi, is a species of termite of the genus Odontotermes. It is native to India and Sri Lanka. It is a pest of tea.

References

External links
A Preliminary Inventory of Subterranean Termites in the Premises of Faculty of Science, University of Kelaniya and the Potential of a Ponerine Ant Species, Neemazal-F and Citronella Oil in the Control of Two Termite Species
TERMITES ON CEYLON TEA ESTATES

Termites
Insects described in 1906
Insects of Sri Lanka